Jianwu (建武) was a Chinese era name used by several emperors of China. It may refer to:

Jianwu (25–56), era name used by Emperor Guangwu of Han
Jianwu (304), era name used by Emperor Hui of Jin
Jianwu (317–318), era name used by Emperor Yuan of Jin
Jianwu (335–348), era name used by Shi Hu, emperor of Later Zhao
Jianwu (386), era name used by Murong Zhong, emperor of Western Yan
Jianwu (494–498), era name used by Emperor Ming of Southern Qi
Jianwu (529), era name used by Yuan Hao, self-proclaimed ruler of Northern Wei

See also
Sword dance, known in Chinese as Jianwu